Washington Sebastián Abreu Gallo (born 17 October 1976) is a Uruguayan football manager and former player who played as a striker. He is the current manager of Peruvian club Universidad César Vallejo.

He is best known for his record of appearing for 32 teams in 11 countries during his professional career. Nicknamed Loco (Madman in Spanish), the prolific scorer for club and national team initially retired in 2021 after a four-month stint with Sud América, but later that same year came out of retirement with Olimpia de Minas.

A Uruguayan international for more than 15 years, Abreu represented his country in two World Cups and three Copa América tournaments, winning the latter in 2011.

Playing career

Club

Early career
Born in Minas, Lavalleja Department, Abreu played in numerous clubs throughout the Americas (Uruguay, Argentina, Mexico and Brazil). He also had an unsuccessful stint with Spain's Deportivo de La Coruña, which loaned him several times for the duration of his contract.

In his sole season in La Liga, which started in January 1998, having been signed from San Lorenzo, Abreu scored for the Galicians in a 3–1 home defeat of Barcelona on 25 January.

River Plate and Beitar
After having joined Mexico's UANL in 2007, Abreu was able to rescind his contract with them in order to join River Plate – the Mexican Football Federation stalled on recognising the transfer because of an imposed moratorium between the clubs. He became the only foreigner to score in the Clásico Regiomontano (Tigres vs. Monterrey, which he represented the previous year) against each team.

In the middle of 2008, after exhausting negotiations, Abreu signed a deal with Israeli League champions Beitar Jerusalem. He appeared in the qualifying rounds of the UEFA Champions League, but his team was quickly eliminated. Additionally, he could not play in the domestic front due to lack of payment.

Abreu re-signed with River Plate in September 2008 after terminating his link with Beitar, with a deal lasting until June 2009. Due to being a late addition, he was not able to play for the side in the Primera División, only featuring in the Copa Sudamericana. The next year, he was eligible for both the domestic and Copa Libertadores fronts.

Real Sociedad
In early January 2009, Abreu returned to Spain after a ten-year absence, being loaned by River to Segunda División side Real Sociedad, which had lost habitual first choice Iñigo Díaz de Cerio for the season due to a serious leg injury.

On 14 March 2009, he scored a hat-trick in a 3–1 away win against league leaders Xerez. His team, however, ultimately failed in returning to the top flight.

Botafogo
On 13 June 2009, Aris in Greece signed Abreu from River Plate. However, in January of the following year, the 33-year-old changed club and country again, agreeing on a two-year contract with Brazil's Botafogo.

Abreu scored the second goal in the 2–1 victory over Flamengo on 18 April 2010, which gave the team the Campeonato Carioca title. In July, he had his link extended until 31 December 2012 with a release clause of US$11.3 million, with the player declaring he had previously held talks with Universidad de Chile and Trabzonspor of Turkey.

On 6 February 2011, Abreu was involved in a dramatic match against Fluminense: his team won a penalty kick as they were losing 2–1, and he shot it in Panenka-style, with Diego Cavalieri saving the shot by simply standing still. Another penalty was awarded just five minutes later, and he shot it in the same fashion, this time into the right-hand corner of the goal, as the goalkeeper dived the other way; a few minutes later, Botafogo scored again and won the game.

Abreu was loaned to fellow Série A side Figueirense on 5 July 2012. However, as the season went on to end in relegation, his contract was ended via Twitter on 24 November, one day before the last game against Grêmio.

Sol de América
From January 2013 to December 2015, Abreu was under contract to Nacional, also being loaned to Rosario Central and Aucas during this timeframe. On 28 December 2015, Paraguayan newspaper D10 reported that he had met in Uruguay with Sol de América chairman Miguel Figueredo. He had already received a more lucrative offer from Mexico, but declined in order to be closer to his country, and was officially confirmed on 6 January 2016.

Bangu
On 12 November 2016, 40-year-old Abreu joined Brazil's Bangu from Santa Tecla, with the deal being made effective the following January. After ten appearances in the Rio de Janeiro State League, he left.

Later years

On 4 April 2017, Abreu signed with Montevideo-based team Central Español of the Uruguayan Segunda División. In late December of the same year, he joined Chilean Primera División's Audax Italiano from Puerto Montt, in the same country but one level below; this transfer broke a world record, as it marked him as the first player to have played for 26 professional clubs.

Abreu returned to Brazil in December 2018 at age 42, agreeing to a contract at Série D's Rio Branco. He returned to his homeland the following July, signing with Boston River and making his Primera División debut in a 0–0 draw against River Plate where he donned jersey number 113.

On 8 February 2021, Abreu signed for Athletic Club in Brazil. After four matches in the Campeonato Mineiro, he terminated his contract on 21 March due to the COVID-19 pandemic.

On 30 March 2021, Abreu joined newly promoted Uruguayan top-tier club Sud América. On 10 June, he announced his decision to retire from professional football, and it was reported on news the game against Liverpool the following day would be his last.

Abreu's hometown side Olimpia de Minas announced on 29 August 2021 that he would briefly come out of retirement to play for them in the local Campeonato Minuano. He finished as champion of the +40 category tournament of ADIC (Asociación Deportiva de Integración Colegial), and also top scorer with 17 goals in 11 matches for the amateur (college) team Colegio Jesús María 2019, being the second championship won in the year after the Apertura, where he also ranked first in the scoring charts.

International

Abreu played for Uruguay at the 2002 FIFA World Cup – three matches – and the 1997, 2007 and 2011 Copa América editions, netting twice in the latter. He made his debut for the national side on 17 July 1996 in a friendly with China, going on to earn 70 caps.

On 27 May 2010, Abreu stood only five goals short of Uruguayan all-time goalscoring record, held by Héctor Scarone for 79 years. He was selected for the 2010 World Cup in South Africa, where he appeared three times as a substitute; in the quarter-finals against Ghana he scored the decisive penalty shootout attempt (1–1 after 120 minutes), a Panenka to send his team to the semi-finals for the first time in 40 years.

Coaching career
On 26 April 2019, Abreu was announced as the interim manager of Santa Tecla on an initial one-and-a-half month spell, with the parties holding the option open of keeping him as a player-coach or just as a player afterwards. He won the Copa El Salvador four days later, defeating Audaz 1–0 in the final.

In December 2019, Abreu was appointed player-coach at Boston River ahead of the upcoming campaign in the Uruguayan Primera División. He resigned from the last-placed club the following 9 November.

Abreu was named manager of Bolivian Primera División side Always Ready on 30 January 2022. On 1 March, he left by mutual consent.

On 25 May 2022, Abreu was appointed at Paysandú in the Uruguayan Primera División Amateur.

Personal life
Abreu's son, Diego, played for Mexico at under-16 level.

From October 2019 to August 2020 he hosted Trato Hecho, the Uruguayan version of Deal or No Deal, being replaced by Maximiliano de la Cruz.

Honours

Player
San Lorenzo
Argentine Primera División: 2001 Clausura

Nacional
Uruguayan Primera División: 2001, 2003 Apertura, 2004 Apertura, 2005

River Plate
Argentine Primera División: 2008 Clausura

Botafogo
Campeonato Carioca: 2010
Taça Guanabara: 2010
Taça Rio: 2010, 2012

Santa Tecla
Salvadoran Primera División: 2016 Apertura

Uruguay
Copa América: 2011

Individual
Mexican Primera División Golden Boot: Verano 2000, Verano 2002, Apertura 2005, Clausura 2006

Manager
Santa Tecla
Copa El Salvador: 2018–19

References

External links

Stats at Football.org 
National team data 

 

1976 births
Living people
People from Minas, Uruguay
Uruguayan footballers
Association football forwards
Uruguayan Primera División players
Uruguayan Segunda División players
Defensor Sporting players
Club Nacional de Football players
Central Español players
Boston River players
Sud América players
Argentine Primera División players
San Lorenzo de Almagro footballers
Club Atlético River Plate footballers
Rosario Central footballers
La Liga players
Segunda División players
Deportivo de La Coruña players
Real Sociedad footballers
Campeonato Brasileiro Série A players
Grêmio Foot-Ball Porto Alegrense players
Botafogo de Futebol e Regatas players
Figueirense FC players
Bangu Atlético Clube players
Rio Branco Football Club players
Liga MX players
Tecos F.C. footballers
Cruz Azul footballers
Club América footballers
Dorados de Sinaloa footballers
C.F. Monterrey players
San Luis F.C. players
Tigres UANL footballers
Beitar Jerusalem F.C. players
Super League Greece players
Aris Thessaloniki F.C. players
Ecuadorian Serie A players
S.D. Aucas footballers
Paraguayan Primera División players
Club Sol de América footballers
Santa Tecla F.C. footballers
Chilean Primera División players
Primera B de Chile players
Puerto Montt footballers
Audax Italiano footballers
Magallanes footballers
Uruguay international footballers
1997 Copa América players
2002 FIFA World Cup players
2007 Copa América players
2010 FIFA World Cup players
2011 Copa América players
Copa América-winning players
Uruguayan expatriate footballers
Expatriate footballers in Argentina
Expatriate footballers in Spain
Expatriate footballers in Brazil
Expatriate footballers in Mexico
Expatriate footballers in Israel
Expatriate footballers in Greece
Expatriate footballers in Ecuador
Expatriate footballers in Paraguay
Expatriate footballers in El Salvador
Expatriate footballers in Chile
Uruguayan expatriate sportspeople in Argentina
Uruguayan expatriate sportspeople in Spain
Uruguayan expatriate sportspeople in Brazil
Uruguayan expatriate sportspeople in Mexico
Uruguayan expatriate sportspeople in Israel
Uruguayan expatriate sportspeople in Greece
Uruguayan expatriate sportspeople in Ecuador
Uruguayan expatriate sportspeople in Paraguay
Uruguayan expatriate sportspeople in El Salvador
Uruguayan expatriate sportspeople in Chile
Uruguayan football managers
Uruguayan Primera División managers
Boston River managers
Bolivian Primera División managers
Club Always Ready managers
Peruvian Primera División managers
Club Deportivo Universidad César Vallejo managers
Uruguayan expatriate football managers
Expatriate football managers in El Salvador
Expatriate football managers in Bolivia
Expatriate football managers in Peru
Uruguayan expatriate sportspeople in Bolivia
Uruguayan expatriate sportspeople in Peru
Uruguayan television presenters